There are thirty districts in the Pakistan province of Sindh. These districts together contain 119 tehsils, 1100 Union Councils and 66,923 human settlements, as per the 1998 census. Each district has a headquarter, often referred to as a capital of the district.

Karachi, the capital of Sindh, is the most populous city district, as well as the most densely populated. It was initially a single district, now has been further subdivided into East, West, South, Central, Malir, Keamari and Korangi districts.

Currently the Sindh government is planning to divide the Tharparkar district into Tharparkar and Chhachro district, Khairpur district into Khairpur and Thari Mirwah district, Sanghar district into Sanghar and Shahdadpur district.

History

Colonial Times

1839-1936

In 1839, British Invaded the Sind.

On 1843's annexation Sind was merged into Bombay Presidency and form a division of Bombay Presidency.

Districts and Divisions were both introduced in Sind as administrative units by the British when Sind became a part of British India, and ever since then, they have formed an integral part in the civil administration of the Sind. At the time in 1843, the Sind was divided into 3 districts, under 1 division (Khairpur state can't included);

The administration given below:

Sind Division
Hyderabad District
Karachi District
Shikarpur District

In 1846-47 Upper Sind Frontier district headquarter was Khangarh (Jacobabad) carved out of Shikarpur district.

The administration given below:
Sind Division
Hyderabad District
Karachi District
Shikarpur District
Upper Sind Frontier District

In 1882, British government create a new district named Thar and Parkar by bifurcation of Hyderabad district and In 1883, Headquarter of Shikarpur district was shifted from Shikarpur to Sukkur.

The administration given below:
Sind Division
Hyderabad District
Karachi District
Shikarpur District
Upper Sind Frontier District
Thar and Parkar District

On 1 August 1901, British government split Shikarpur and Karachi district to create Larkana district and district status of Shikarpur also shifted to Sukkur.

The administration given below:
Sind Division
Hyderabad District
Karachi District
Sukkur District (Formally Shikarpur)
Upper Sind Frontier District
Thar and Parkar District
Larkana District
 
On 1 November 1912, Hyderabad district again split to create Nawabshah district.

The administration given below:
Sind Division
Hyderabad District
Karachi District
Sukkur District (Formally Shikarpur)
Upper Sind Frontier District
Thar and Parkar District
Larkana District
Nawabshah District

In 1931, British government divided Karachi and Larkana district to create Dadu district.

The administration given below:
Sind Division
Hyderabad District
Karachi District
Sukkur District (Formally Shikarpur)
Upper Sind Frontier District
Thar and Parkar District
Larkana District
Nawabshah District
Dadu District

1936-1947
On April 1, 1936, Sind was separated from Bombay Presidency to form a separate province of British India. At that time Sind division changed to form Hyderabad division.

The administration given below:
Hyderabad Division
Hyderabad District
Karachi District
Sukkur District (Formally Shikarpur)
Upper Sind Frontier District
Thar and Parkar District
Larkana District
Nawabshah District
Dadu District

1947-1955

In 1947's partition, Sind joined Pakistan.

In 1948, Karachi district split into two districts to create Thatta district and Karachi district separated from Sind province to New Country's Capital Territory.

The administration as given below:
Hyderabad Division
Hyderabad District
Sukkur District
Upper Sind Frontier District
Thar and Parkar District
Larkana District
Nawabshah District
Dadu District
Thatta District

In 1952, Upper Sind Frontier district renamed to Jacobabad district

In 1953, Thar and parkar and Nawabshah district also split into two districts to create Sanghar district.

The administration as given below:
Hyderabad Division
Hyderabad District
Sukkur District
Jacobabad District 
Thar and Parkar District
Larkana District
Nawabshah District
Dadu District
Thatta District
Sanghar District

On 14 October 1955, Khairpur state merged into Sind province and gave the status of district or divisional headquarter.

The administration as given below:
Hyderabad Division
Hyderabad District
Thar and Parkar District
Dadu District
Thatta District
Sanghar District
Khairpur Division
Khairpur District
Sukkur District
Jacobabad District
Larkana District
Nawabshah District

1955-1970

On 30 September 1955, To diminish the differences between the two regions, claimed the government, the 'One Unit' programme merged the four provinces of West Pakistan into a single province to parallel the province of East Pakistan (now Bangladesh).

1970-2000

On 1 July 1970, West Pakistan was abolished and all four provinces of Pakistan were restored as 1947.

The administration as given below:
Hyderabad Division
Hyderabad District
Thar and Parkar District
Dadu District
Thatta District
Sanghar District
Khairpur Division
Khairpur District
Sukkur District
Jacobabad District
Larkana District
Nawabshah District
Karachi-Bela Division (In 1959, the capital region was merged with West Pakistan and in 1960, Karachi Bela Division was formed comprising Karachi and Las Bela District)
Karachi District
Lasbela District

In 1972, the Lasbela district transferred to Kalat division of Balochistan Province and Karachi district divided into three districts(Karachi-Bela Division also renamed to Karachi Division).

The administration as given below:
Hyderabad Division
Hyderabad District
Thar and Parkar District
Dadu District
Thatta District
Sanghar District
Khairpur Division
Khairpur District
Sukkur District
Jacobabad District
Larkana District
Nawabshah District
Karachi Division 
South Karachi District
East Karachi District
West Karachi District

In 1975, a new district was formed – Badin district carved out of Hyderabad district and Abolish Khairpur Division and replace it with Sukkur Division۔

The administration as given below:
Hyderabad Division
Hyderabad District
Thar and Parkar District
Dadu District
Thatta District
Sanghar District
Badin District
Sukkur Division (Formally Khairpur Division)
Khairpur District
Sukkur District
Jacobabad District
Larkana District
Nawabshah District
Karachi Division
South Karachi District
East Karachi District
West Karachi District

In 1977, Shikarpur district again was re-maintained.

The administration as given below:
Hyderabad Division
Hyderabad District
Thar and Parkar District
Dadu District
Thatta District
Sanghar District
Badin District
Sukkur Division (Formally Khairpur Division)
Khairpur District
Sukkur District
Jacobabad District
Larkana District
Nawabshah District
Shikarpur District
Karachi Division
South Karachi District
East Karachi District
West Karachi District

In 1980s, Larkana Division established by bifurcation of Sukkur Division.

The administration as given below:
Hyderabad Division
Hyderabad District
Thar and Parkar District
Dadu District
Thatta District
Sanghar District
Badin District
Sukkur Division (Formally Khairpur Division)
Khairpur District
Sukkur District
Nawabshah District
Karachi Division
South Karachi District
East Karachi District
West Karachi District
Larkana Division
Larkana District
Jacobabad District
Shikarpur District

In 1983, Sukkur district again spitting out to form Ghotki district.

The administration as given below:
Hyderabad Division
Hyderabad District
Thar and Parkar District
Dadu District
Thatta District
Sanghar District
Badin District
Sukkur Division (Formally Khairpur Division)
Khairpur District
Sukkur District
Nawabshah District
Ghotki District
Karachi Division
South Karachi District
East Karachi District
West Karachi District
Larkana Division
Larkana District
Jacobabad District
Shikarpur District

In 1989, Naushahro Feroze district carved out of Nawabshah district.

The administration as given below:
Hyderabad Division
Hyderabad District
Thar and Parkar District
Dadu District
Thatta District
Sanghar District
Badin District
Sukkur Division (Formally Khairpur Division)
Khairpur District
Sukkur District
Nawabshah District
Ghotki District
Naushahro Feroze District
Karachi Division
South Karachi District
East Karachi District
West Karachi District
Larkana Division
Larkana District
Jacobabad District
Shikarpur District

On 31 October 1990, Mirpurkhas district carved out of Tharparkar district and Spelt Hyderabad Division to established Mirpur khas Division.

The administration as given below:
Hyderabad Division
Hyderabad District
Dadu District
Thatta District
Badin District
Sukkur Division (Formally Khairpur Division)
Khairpur District
Sukkur District
Nawabshah District
Ghotki District
Naushahro Feroze District
Karachi Division
South Karachi District
East Karachi District
West Karachi District
Larkana Division
Larkana District
Jacobabad District
Shikarpur District
Mirpur Khas Division
Mirpur Khas District
Tharparkar District
Sanghar District

On 17 April 1993, Tharparkar district again spilt out to form Umerkot district.

The administration as given below:
Hyderabad Division
Hyderabad District
Dadu District
Thatta District
Badin District
Sukkur Division (Formally Khairpur Division)
Khairpur District
Sukkur District
Nawabshah District
Ghotki District
Naushahro Feroze District
Karachi Division
South Karachi District
East Karachi District
West Karachi District
Larkana Division
Larkana District
Jacobabad District
Shikarpur District
Mirpur Khas Division
Mirpur Khas District
Tharparkar District
Sanghar District
Umerkot District

In 1996, two more (02) districts created in the Karachi division;Central and Malir district.

The administration as given below:
Hyderabad Division
Hyderabad District
Dadu District
Thatta District
Badin District
Sukkur Division(Formally Khairpur Division)
Khairpur District
Sukkur District
Nawabshah District
Ghotki District
Naushahro Feroze District
Karachi Division
South Karachi District
Central Karachi District
East Karachi District
West Karachi District
Malir District
Larkana Division
Larkana District
Jacobabad District
Shikarpur District
Mirpur Khas Division
Mirpur Khas District
Tharparkar District
Sanghar District
Umerkot District

2000-Present

On 2000, During Pervaiz Musharraf rule five districts of Karachi division was merged and create Karachi city district the government of Pakistan abolished divisions.

The administration as given below:

Hyderabad District
Dadu District
Thatta District
Badin District
Khairpur District
Sukkur District
Nawabshah District
Ghotki District
Naushahro Feroze District
Karachi City District
Larkana District
Jacobabad District
Shikarpur District
Mirpur Khas District
Tharparkar District
Sanghar District
Umerkot District

In 2004, 3 new districts were formed - Qambar Shahdadkot district carved out of Larkana district; Jamshoro district out of the Dadu district and Kashmore district out of Jacobabad district.

The administration as given below:

Hyderabad District
Dadu District
Thatta District
Badin District
Khairpur District
Sukkur District
Nawabshah District
Ghotki District
Naushahro Feroze District
Karachi City District
Larkana District
Jacobabad District
Shikarpur District
Mirpur Khas District
Tharparkar District
Sanghar District
Umerkot District
Qambar Shahdadkot District
Jamshoro District
Kashmore District

In 2005, Hyderabad district was carved out to form three new districts of Tando Muhammad Khan, Matiari and Tando Allahyar.

The administration as given below:

Hyderabad District
Dadu District
Thatta District
Badin District
Khairpur District
Sukkur District
Nawabshah District
Ghotki District
Naushahro Feroze District
Karachi City District
Larkana District
Jacobabad District
Shikarpur District
Mirpur Khas District
Tharparkar District
Sanghar District
Umerkot District
Qambar Shahdadkot District
Jamshoro District
Kashmore District
Tando Muhammad Khan District
Tando Allahyar District
Matiari District

In September 2008, Sindh Cabinet renamed the Nawabshah district to Shaheed Benazirabad.

The administration as given below:

Hyderabad District
Dadu District
Thatta District
Badin District
Khairpur District
Sukkur District
Shaheed Benazirabad District
Ghotki District
Naushahro Feroze District
Karachi City District
Larkana District
Jacobabad District
Shikarpur District
Mirpur Khas District
Tharparkar District
Sanghar District
Umerkot District
Qambar Shahdadkot District
Jamshoro District
Kashmore District
Tando Muhammad Khan District
Tando Allahyar District
Matiari District

On 11 July 2011, Government restored Administration division.

The administration as given below:
Hyderabad Division
Hyderabad District
Dadu District
Thatta District
Badin District
Jamshoro District
Tando Muhammad Khan District
Tando Allahyar District
Matiari District
Sukkur Division
Khairpur District
Sukkur District
Shaheed Benazirabad District
Ghotki District
Naushahro Feroze District
Karachi Division
South Karachi District
Central Karachi District
East Karachi District
West Karachi District
Malir District
Larkana Division
Larkana District
Jacobabad District
Shikarpur District
Qambar Shahdadkot District
Kashmore District
Mirpur Khas Division
Mirpur Khas District
Tharparkar District
Sanghar District
Umerkot District

On 7 August 2011, Shaheed Benazirabad district transferred from Sukkur to Hyderabad division.

The administration as given below:
Hyderabad Division
Hyderabad District
Dadu District
Thatta District
Badin District
Jamshoro District
Tando Muhammad Khan District
Tando Allahyar District
Matiari District
Shaheed Benazirabad District
Sukkur Division
Khairpur District
Sukkur District
Ghotki District
Naushahro Feroze District
Karachi Division
South Karachi District
Central Karachi District
East Karachi District
West Karachi District
Malir District
Larkana Division
Larkana District
Jacobabad District
Shikarpur District
Qambar Shahdadkot District
Kashmore District
Mirpur Khas Division
Mirpur Khas District
Tharparkar District
Sanghar District
Umerkot District

In Oct 2013, two new districts were formed- Sujawal District was carved out of Thatta District and Korangi district was carved out of East district.

The administration as given below:
Hyderabad Division
Hyderabad District
Dadu District
Thatta District
Badin District
Jamshoro District
Tando Muhammad Khan District
Tando Allahyar District
Matiari District
Sujawal District
Shaheed Benazirabad District
Sukkur Division
Khairpur District
Sukkur District
Ghotki District
Naushahro Feroze District
Karachi Division
South Karachi District
Central Karachi District
East Karachi District
West Karachi District
Malir District
Korangi District
Larkana Division
Larkana District
Jacobabad District
Shikarpur District
Qambar Shahdadkot District
Kashmore District
Mirpur Khas Division
Mirpur Khas District
Tharparkar District
Sanghar District
Umerkot District

On 24 April 2014, Create Banbhore Division by bifurcation of Hyderabad division and On 6 June 2014, Sindh Cabinet Create Shaheed Benazirabad Division by bifurcation of Sukkur, Hyderabad and Mirpur Khas division.

The administration as given below:
Hyderabad Division
Hyderabad District
Dadu District
Jamshoro District
Tando Muhammad Khan District
Tando Allahyar District
Matiari District
Sukkur Division
Khairpur District
Sukkur District
Ghotki District
Karachi Division
South Karachi District
Central Karachi District
East Karachi District
West Karachi District
Malir District
Korangi District
Larkana Division
Larkana District
Jacobabad District
Shikarpur District
Qambar Shahdadkot District
Kashmore District
Mirpur Khas Division
Mirpur Khas District
Tharparkar District
Umerkot District
Banbhore Division
Thatta District
Badin District
Sujawal District
Shaheed Benazirabad Division
Shaheed Benazirabad District
Naushahro Feroze District
Sanghar District

In 2020, Keamari District was created after splitting Karachi West District.

The administration as given below:
Hyderabad Division
Hyderabad District
Dadu District
Jamshoro District
Tando Muhammad Khan District
Tando Allahyar District
Matiari District
Sukkur Division
Khairpur District
Sukkur District
Ghotki District
Karachi Division
South Karachi District
Central Karachi District
East Karachi District
West Karachi District
Malir District
Korangi District
Keamari District
Larkana Division
Larkana District
Jacobabad District
Shikarpur District
Qambar Shahdadkot District
Kashmore District
Mirpur Khas Division
Mirpur Khas District
Tharparkar District
Umerkot District
Banbhore Division
Thatta District
Badin District
Sujawal District
Shaheed Benazirabad Division
Shaheed Benazirabad District
Naushahro Feroze District
Sanghar District

Currently the Sindh government is planning to divide the Tharparkar district into Tharparkar and Chhachro district, Khairpur district into Khairpur and Thari Mirwah district and Sanghar district into Sanghar and Shahdadpur district.

Divisions of Sindh

List of Districts

See also
 List of tehsils of Sindh
 Districts of Pakistan
Districts of Khyber Pakhtunkhwa
Districts of Punjab (Pakistan)
Districts of Balochistan (Pakistan)
Districts of Azad Kashmir
Districts of Gilgit-Baltistan

Notes

References

 
Sindh